is a Japanese BL visual novel created by Nitro+CHiRAL. The plot centers on Akira, a young man who is made to participate in a deadly game called "Igura" (from "игра"/ "igra", Russian for "game") in post-apocalyptic Japan in exchange for being freed from prison. His goal is to beat "Il Re" (Italian for "The King"), the strongest person in Igura. The game was originally released on PC as Togainu no Chi in 2005, with a PlayStation 2 version titled Togainu no Chi TRUE BLOOD being released on May 29, 2008. A PlayStation Portable version was released on December 23, 2010 under the name of Togainu no Chi True Blood Portable.

The game has been adapted into two manga series, a novel and a twelve episode anime series. In March 2010 as part of the Nitro+CHiRAL 5th anniversary an anime adaptation was announced for Togainu no Chi with production by Aniplex. The anime began airing on MBS and TBS on October 7, 2010. Aniplex of America streamed and simulcast the series in North America on Anime News Network.

Plot
After being devastated in the third World War (known as The Third Division), Japan was divided in two: the CFC, which controls the east half of Japan, and Nikkouren, which controls the west. Several years after the end of the war, a crime organization called Vischio has taken control of the destroyed city of Toshima (formerly Tokyo, Japan's capital city), where they are holding a battle game known as Igura.

Igura is a vicious battle game that may result in the death or murder of participants. To participate, one must go to Toshima's palace, meet with a man named Arbitro, and tell him their reason for their decision to enter into Igura. Upon meeting with Arbitro, participants are given five dog tags, each engraved like a card in a standard deck of playing cards. One tag must hang from the participant's neck as proof of participation. Participants must then put their lives on the line to collect others' tags, with the goal being to collect a Straight or a Full House using cards 10 through Ace. (The game incorrectly refers to such a Straight as a Royal Flush, which is a poker hand that requires that all cards be of the same suit.) Tags representing cards less than 10 are referred to as "pig tags" and can be used in dedicated neutral zones to purchase sustenance, first aid supplies, and other essentials. If a participant collects a Straight or Full House consisting of the tags representing the cards 10 through Ace, they earn the right to challenge Il Re in battle.

The rules for combat dictate that battles must be between two participants with at least one non-participating witness present, and end when one combatant either dies or allows their back to touch the ground. The winner takes the loser's tags and is free to do as they please to the loser after that, often consisting of rape and resulting in the loser's death; however, many of the participants wantonly break the rules of the game. Two executioners, Gunji and Kiriwar, work for Arbitro, patrolling Toshima to kill rule breakers and to clean up the corpses of the fallen; however, they view themselves above the rules and often kill participants at their whims without consequences.

Many participants use a drug called "Rein," which temporarily boosts their strength significantly and gives them an advantage in battle; however, Rein has many side effects, is extremely addictive, and the withdrawal is unbearably unpleasant and can even be fatal. Il Re is involved in the distribution of Rein, which leads to him having a high level of wealth. If they defeat Il Re, they assume his position in distributing Rein and become incredibly wealthy, which is the primary motivation for many of the fighters who join Igura.

The game begins with the protagonist, a young man named Akira living in the CFC district of Japan and a champion in Bl@ster - a fighting game with much stricter rules and moderation than Igura - being falsely accused of murder and arrested. After some time in prison, a mysterious woman and man involved in the government visit him, offering him freedom from his sentence if he agrees to participate in Igura and defeat Il Re.

The story follows Akira's life in the harsh, lawless Toshima as he fights both to survive and to unravel the mysteries developing around him. The game has multiple endings, and binary decision points during the story determine which ending the player will achieve. Many of them are brutal, and the game contains themes around rape, BDSM, mutilation, and murder.

Characters

The game's protagonist. Akira is the cool and silent type. He has grayish hair, blue eyes, and stands at 172cm tall. He likes omelet rice flavored Solids. He grew up as an orphan along with Keisuke. Akira was an undefeated champion of the street fighting game "Bl@ster", where he participated in the RAY district under the name LOST. He was accused of murder and sentenced to life imprisonment, but Emma and Gwen had him removed from prison so he could participate in Igura, which he does with slight reluctance. He usually acts cold and uncaring with an indifference to life and death, but has a very naive side to him. His weapon is a knife.

Akira's childhood friend and hard-working factory employee. He has brown hair and eyes and is 178cm tall, and he likes green curry flavored Solids. He and Akira grew up together in the same orphanage. Because he is a bit weak, he has always admired Akira's strength and suffers from low self-esteem and self-deprecation. Though he is a bit quiet and shy, if Akira is involved, he suddenly becomes bold. Upon hearing Akira's situation, Keisuke covertly chases after Akira and also joins Igura, despite his weakness and lack of fighting experience.

A young blond, blue-eyed boy participating in Igura. 154cm tall. Though he is sometimes mistaken for a girl because of his small body, he is quite strong and able to get by in Igura. He helps Akira around the town and his optimism serves as a foil to Akira's nihilism and inspires Akira to continue to pursue his goals. In the anime, it is mentioned that Rin and Shiki are half brothers, having the same father but different mothers. He is a former Bl@ster participant (from the GHOST area) who fights with two small daggers and also enjoys taking pictures. He likes the yakiniku flavored Solids. He's also good at parkour, as he jumps from roofs and walls in the manga and anime.

A black-haired, red-eyed man standing at 188cm and covered in black clothing who arms himself with a katana. He is the strongest man in Igura. Because he often appears in front of Igura participants and slays them immediately and with no warning, he is extremely feared. Though he kills Igura participants frequently, he neither carries nor collects tags, and thus does not appear to be an Igura participant. He is a violent man shrouded in mystery. The first Il Re who has never been defeated. Shiki formed the Igura in order to battle against Line-compatibles, so he could kill Nano and quell his memories of the first time they met.

An unshaven, middle-aged information collector who knows a lot about the tournament. Has brown hair and eyes and stands at 183cm tall. He has a friendly, carefree personality and is a heavy smoker. He does not participate in the game, but is in Toshima to observe it. He carries a gun for protection.

Manager of the narcotics organization Vischio. A gaudy blond man who always wears a mask over his face. 181cm tall. Has a strange hobby involving modifying the bodies of attractive young men in gruesome ways, which he views as a form of artistic expression. Due to this "hobby", his mansion is full of statues of nude boys and he keeps Kau, a heavily mutilated boy, as his pet 'dog'. He also maintains a collection of disfigured slaves, with which he uses to reward people.

Arbitro's beloved 'pet', who is actually a young boy. He has white hair, is covered in black leather and a blindfold, and has a large scar and piercings on his stomach (due to Arbitro's personal preferences), and walks on all fours. Because Arbitro destroyed his eyes and vocal cords, he cannot see or speak. He does, however, have a keen sense of smell, and has been trained to pick up the scent of dog tags to help find rule-breakers within Igura. His name's kanji means "dog" in Japanese. He shows signs of severe Stockholm syndrome.

Executes the rule violators of the tournament. Though he works for Arbitro, his ties to him are loose and he often likes to get him mad. At 200cm, he is a tall, strong man who carries a metal pipe (which he has lovingly named "Mitsuko") as a weapon. He has short, black hair and a scar across his forehead. He is usually seen with Gunji, who he calls "hiyo" or "hiyoko" (which means "baby chick"). Kiriwar likes to mess with Arbitro and seems to not care much about his job. His name is pronounced "Kiriwo" but is officially written as "Kiriwar".

Executes the rule violators of the tournament. He is a 195cm tall blond man who fights with metal knuckle claws. He wears a bright red hooded jacket that is open at the front, exposing most of his tattoo-covered torso. Gunji is not very smart and acts spontaneously and violently, and is extremely sadistic in his killings, but still has a fun-loving, childish innocence to him. Gunji has an affinity with name calling. He is usually seen with Kiriwar, who he calls "jijii" ("old man"), calls Arbitro "papa", and Shiki "Shikitty". Gunji seems to confuse cats with dogs, since although Kau is supposed to be a pet "dog", Gunji refers to him as 'Tama', which is a common pet name for a cat. In the manga, he also names a cat that he finds 'Pochi', the common pet name for a dog. Also, though many English-speaking fans spell and pronounce his name as "Gunzi", the name "Gunji" is considered the 'official' name as it is used most often and also used on official merchandise.

A beautiful one-armed woman. 167cm tall. She is the one who suggests participating in Igura to Akira as a way to free him of his false charge. She is often seen with Gwen. Very little is known about her, but before the war she worked as a scientist. In the manga, by Chayamachi, she is seen taking care of Nano.

A serious man in a suit and hat that appears with Emma to convince Akira to participate in Igura. An honest man with a normally harsh expression. 178cm tall.

A one-eyed youth participating in Igura with an extreme passion to win, no matter what it takes.

Known as N or Nano, he is an enigmatic figure throughout the game. He is not an Igura participant and carries neither tags nor a weapon, despite the dangers in Toshima. He dresses very conservatively, which adds to his unsettling behavior. 182cm tall. Though he often appears in front of Akira, it is a mystery as to whether he is a friend or foe. Nano's blood is the source of Line. His real name is Nicole Premier.

A long-haired man participating in Igura. Though he seems to know Rin, they are not on very good terms with each other.

A black-haired man somehow connected to Rin and Tomoyuki who seems to resemble someone else Rin knows.

A young blond man participating in Igura with a team. He is his team's leader. Yukihito is one of his team members.

A red-haired man in his 20s and new character added to "Togainu no Chi: True Blood", the Playstation 2 version of the game. He is a former Bl@ster participant (from AREA: RUDE) who is currently participating in Igura as a member of Touya's team.

Media

Drama CDs
Three drama Cd's were released after the games release on Pc in 2005. Togainu no Chi Image drama CD vol 1 was released July 29, 2005. This drama CD centers around Akira and Shiki's relationship. Togainu no Chi Image drama CD vol 2 was released August 26, 2005. This drama CD centers around Akira and Keisuke's relationship. Togainu no Chi ANOTHER STORY ~ RIN was released December 29, 2005. This drama CD centers around Rin.

Manga
A manga adaptation of Togainu no Chi, illustrated by Suguro Chayamachi, began serialization serialized in Comic B's LOG in January 2006, and is published by Enterbrain. The manga was licensed for an English-language release in North America by Tokyopop in 2008. Another adaptation was illustrated by Yamamoto Kana and published by ASCII Media Works. This version focuses on Keisuke's storyline. The complete volume was released on July 22, 2008.

Books
A light novel Togainu no Chi written by Ikumi Kazuha (伊久美和葉) and Nitro+CHiRAL, illustrated by Tatana Kana (たたなかな) and Kazuki Tomomaya (かずきともまや), published by Biblos (ビブロス) was released February 3, 2006. It contained sets of short stories dealing with the characters after the events in the game. An art book titled Togainu no Chi True Blood Official Fan Book containing game information, character profiles, artwork and voice actors' interviews was released on July 3, 2008.

Anime
In March 2010 as part of the Nitro+CHiRAL 5th anniversary an anime adaptation was announced for Togainu no Chi with production by Aniplex. The anime began airing on MBS and TBS on October 7, 2010. Aniplex of America will stream and simulcast the series in North America on Anime News Network. The first DVD was released on December 22, 2010.

Episode list

Soundtrack
Opening Theme:

 "Rose-Hip Bullet" by GRANRODEO

Ending Theme:

 "No moral" by Kanako Itou (ep 1)
 "Bright Lights" by Seiji Kimura (ep 2)
 "Don't Stare Me" by VERTUEUX (ep 3)
 "Toge" by SADIE (ep 4)
 "Once More Again" by Aki Misato (ep 5)
 "Requiem Blue" by CurriculuMachine feat. W.K. (ep 6)
 "Crossing Fate" by OLDCODEX (ep 7)
 "Yasashisa ni Mamorarete" by Kita Shuuhei (ep 8)
 "Honed Moon - Togareta Tsuki" by Kanako Itou (ep 9)
 "Don't look away" by CurriculuMachine (ep 10)
 "STILL anime Ver." by Kanako Itou (ep 11)
 "GRIND style GR" by GRANRODEO (ep 12)

Video games
CHiRALmori was released January 25, 2008 and also known as the Nitro+CHiRAL amusement disk. This PC game includes a Togainu no Chi minigame featuring chibi versions of the characters playing poker with their dog tags as well as two other minigames featuring characters from Lamento -Beyond the Void-.

Togainu no Chi Desktop Accessory is a program produced by Nitro+chiral that included wallpapers, a screensaver, a silent version of the opening video, a clock of which can be switched to show images of most of the characters, a calendar, and a set of window straps.

References

External links
 Official Togainu no Chi Website 
 Official Togainu no Chi Image Drama CD Website 
 Official Togainu no Chi True Blood Website 
 Official Togainu no Chi anime website 
 

2005 video games
2006 Japanese novels
2008 video games
A-1 Pictures
Aniplex
ASCII Media Works manga
Enterbrain manga
Japan-exclusive video games
LGBT-related video games
Manga based on video games
PlayStation 2 games
PlayStation Portable games
Tokyopop titles
Video games developed in Japan
Windows games
Yaoi anime and manga
Yaoi video games
HuneX games